The Nathaniel Witherell is a rehabilitation and skilled nursing facility at 70 Parsonage Road in Greenwich, Connecticut.  It is owned and operated by the town on a non-profit basis, providing a range of primarily short-term care services on a  campus north of the central business district.  It was established in 1903, and its campus has been listed on the National Register of Historic Places.

History
The Nathaniel Witherell began as a tuberculosis sanitarium, built in 1911 by Rebecca Witherell and donated to the town the following year. That building, now housing low-income senior housing, was built on land owned by the town and previous used for an almshouse and poor cemetery.  The present main building was constructed in 1932 as an enlargement and functional replacement of the previous facility.  Use of the facility transitioned from exclusively tuberculosis treatment to include other chronic ailments in the 1930s, and by 1955 it had become exclusively devoted to treatment of the elderly.  The facilities underwent enlargement in 1961 and 1975, although the Colonial Revival design of the main building, by architect William Tubby, is still discernible.

Campus
The facilities now include 202 beds, divided for purposes of rehabilitation, long-term care, and memory care. They last received major updates in the 2010s.

See also
National Register of Historic Places listings in Greenwich, Connecticut

References

External links
The Nathaniel Witherell

Historic districts in Fairfield County, Connecticut
Greenwich, Connecticut
National Register of Historic Places in Fairfield County, Connecticut
Nursing homes in the United States